This is a list of All-Ireland Senior Hurling Championship winning managers. The term manager (or coach) only came into widespread use in the 1970s. Up until then hurling teams were usually run by selection panels. Sometimes they contained up to ten members, resulting in self-interest coming to the fore more often than not. All this changed with the appointment of a strong manager, surrounded by a small group of selectors.

Brian Cody of Kilkenny leads the way in terms of All-Ireland wins. He has guided his native county to seven championship titles in ten years. This culminated in the capturing of a famous four-in-a-row between 2006 and 2009. This feat has only been equalled once before, when Cork won four in a row from 1941 to 1944, but this was in a time when selection panels rather than individual managers looked after teams, making Cody's feat unequalled in the modern era.

Monsignor Thomas Maher, managed Kilkenny to 7 All Ireland titles: 1957, 1963, 1967, 1969, 1972, 1974 and 1975. After such success & coaching Tommy Maher became known as the godfather of modern hurling.

Offaly is the only team that has won all of its All-Ireland titles under the management of a non-native. In 1981 and 1985 Dermot Healy, a native of Kilkenny, became the first "outsider" manager when he guided Offaly to the All-Ireland titles. In 1994 Éamonn Cregan steered the county to victory over his native Limerick in the All-Ireland final. Four years later in 1998 Michael Bond took over from Michael "Babs" Keating, another non-native, and guided Offaly to their fourth All-Ireland championship win.

By year

See also
 List of All-Ireland Senior Football Championship winning managers

References

Managers
All-Ireland Senior Hurling Championship